Kahini is a Bengali drama film directed by Malay Bhattacharya and produced by Chandramala Bhattacharya. This film was officially released in India on 17 October 1997 under the banner of Movie Mill. It received 43rd National Film Awards for the best debut film of a Director.

Plot
Rajat decides to kidnap a child. Before execute the plan a stranger gives him some documents and a half burnt photo of a child. Rajat, a painter and a taxi driver start their journey with the kidnapped child but get more and more entangled in complex situations. The physical condition of the child become worse.

Cast
 Dhritiman Chatterjee as Rajat
 Rabi Ghosh
 Debesh Roy Chowdhury as Taxi driver
 Debashish Goswami
 Neelkantha Sengupta
 Anuradha Ghatak
 Ajoy Acharya 	
 Sukhlal Baidya
 Soumyamoy Bakshi
 Soumik Bal
 Jayantamohan Bandyopadhyay 
 Bishwanath Banerjee	
 Indranil Banerjee

References

External links
 

1997 films
Bengali-language Indian films
Indian drama films
1997 drama films
1990s Bengali-language films
Best Debut Feature Film of a Director National Film Award winners